Qinghu station is a station on Line 4 of the Shenzhen Metro and Lines 1 and 2 of the Shenzhen Tram. The station opened on 16 June 2011. It is located in Longhua District, Shenzhen, Guangdong Province, China. This station served as the terminus of Line 4 until 28 October 2020, when it was extended to Niuhu.

Station layout

Exits

References

Railway stations in Guangdong
Shenzhen Metro stations
Longhua District, Shenzhen
Railway stations in China opened in 2011